The Grand Prix du Nouvel-An also called after its sponsor Grand Prix Garage Collé is a cyclo-cross race held in Pétange, Luxembourg.

Past winners

References
  (men)
  (women)
 Cyclocross 24
Cycle races in Luxembourg
Cyclo-cross races
Recurring sporting events established in 1948
1948 establishments in Luxembourg